Shakhtne is an urban-type settlement in Khartsyzk Municipality, Donetsk Raion, Donetsk Oblast of eastern Ukraine. Population:

Demographics
Native language as of the Ukrainian Census of 2001:
 Ukrainian 26.63%
 Russian 73.08%
 Belarusian and Moldovan (Romanian) 0.1%

References

Urban-type settlements in Donetsk Raion